Anything Is Possible may refer to:

 Anything Is Possible (Debbie Gibson album), 1990
 "Anything Is Possible" (Debbie Gibson song)
 Anything Is Possible (Darren Ockert album), 2005
 "Anything Is Possible" (Will Young song), 2002
 Anything Is Possible (film), 2013
 Anything Is Possible (book), 2017 novel by Elizabeth Strout

See also
 Anything's Possible, a sculpture by Linda Serrao
 Tout est possible!, 1974 history book of French leftism by Jean Rabaut
 2008 NBA Finals, in which Kevin Garnett of the Boston Celtics famously said “Anything is possible!”, after the Celtics had won the finals.